Lars Friis (born 1976) is a Danish football coach who is the current assistant of Brian Priske in Czech First League club Sparta Prague. Friis has a UEFA Pro coaching license.

Career 
Friis began his coaching career in 1999 at FC Midtjylland, where he was until 2015, when he also left the club shortly after Glen Riddersholm's departure.  Soon after, he accompanied Riddersholm to AGF as an assistant. In the spring of 2018, he was offered to join Brentford FC as a development coach,
 but after a year he returned to AGF as an assistant, now for David Nielsen. In January 2021, he took up his first head coaching position when he joined Viborg FF.

In January 2022 he was signed by AaB, but was unable to get out of his contract with Viborg until AaB in March 2022 paid compensation, which meant that Friis started as AaB manager on 9 March 2022. Following a poor start to the 2022–23 Danish Superliga season Friis was sacked by AaB on 15 September 2022. On 16 December 2022 Friis was hired as an assistant coach to AC Sparta Prague manager Brian Priske.

References

1976 births
Living people
Danish Superliga managers
Brentford F.C. non-playing staff
Danish football managers
Viborg FF managers
AaB Fodbold managers